Anne Morelli (born in 1948, also known as Anne Mettewie-Morelli) is a Belgian historian of Italian origins, specialized in the history of religions and minorities. She is currently assistant director of the Interdisciplinary center for study of religion and secularism ("Centre interdisciplinaire d'étude des religions et de la laïcité") of the Université Libre de Bruxelles (ULB), where she is a teacher.

Career

She directed in 1995 a book about The Great myths of the history of Belgium, Flanders and Wallonia ("Les grands mythes de l'histoire de Belgique, de Flandre et de Wallonie"), a global attempt by new historians of Belgium to deconstruct nationalist myths e.g. created by the official historiography for nation-building purpose.

Philosophy
Morelli claims she is atheist and considers herself as belonging to the far left.

Anne Morelli is particularly known for her opinions on cults or new religious movements. Like other sociologists and historians, she believes that churches are different from cults only through their relationship to power, and that they are "totalitarian institutions" as well as prisons, hospitals, barracks, boarding houses and some companies.

In 2005, during the 36th annual conference of the International Association of Labour History Institutions in Ghent, she said at the international conference of anti-globalism that no movement has ever achieved a change without using violence. Morelli was part of a group which welcomed Pierre Carette, the main leader of a terrorist group active in 1984-1985, Communist Combatant Cells, when he was released from prison after 17 years, an unusual long imprisonment in Belgium.

Anne Morelli has summarized and systematized the contents of Arthur Ponsonby's classic on war propaganda in "ten commandments of propaganda", which constitute 10 of the essential techniques of propaganda.

We do not want war.
The enemy alone is to be blamed for the war.
The enemy is inherently evil, resembling the devil.
We defend a noble cause, not our own interest.
The enemy commits atrocities on purpose; our mishaps are involuntary.
The enemy uses illegal weapons.
We suffer small losses, those of the enemy are enormous.
Artists and intellectuals back our cause.
Our cause is holy, it has a sacred character.
Whoever doubts our propaganda, is a traitor.

Publications
  La Presse italienne en Belgique (1919-1945), 1981
  La participation des émigrés italiens à la Résistance belge, 1983
  Fascismo e antifascismo nell'emigrazione italiana in Belgio, 1922-1940, 1987
  Les grands mythes de l'histoire de Belgique, de Flandre et de Wallonie (dir.), 1995
  Rital-littérature. Anthologie de la littérature des Italiens de Belgique,1996
  Lettre ouverte à la secte des adversaires des sectes, 1997
  Les émigrants belges : réfugiés de guerre, émigrés économiques, réfugiés religieux et émigrés politiques ayant quitté nos régions du XVIe à nos jours (dir.),1998
  Les religions et la violence avec Lemaire Jacques et Suzanne Charles, 1998
  Le racisme, élément du conflit flamands-francophones ?, 1998
  Principes élémentaires de propagande de guerre (utilisables en cas de guerre froide, chaude ou tiède...), 2001
   - with Alain Dierkens, 2002 
  Les solidarités internationales. Histoire & perspectives with Gotovitch José, 2003
  Histoire des étrangers et de l'immigration en Belgique: de la préhistoire à nos jours (dir.), 2004
  Rubino, l'anarchiste qui tenta d’assassiner Léopold II, 2007

References

1948 births
20th-century Belgian historians
Living people
Belgian people of Italian descent
21st-century Belgian historians